This is the list of the banks in Latin America, as measured by total assets.

By total assets 
The list is based on the April 2022 S&P Global Market Intelligence report of the 50 largest banks in Latin America.

See also
 List of largest banks
 List of largest banks in the Americas
 List of largest banks in North America
 List of largest banks in the United States
 List of largest banks in Southeast Asia

References

Banks of the Americas
Latin America-related lists